GoMart, Inc. is a convenience store chain based in Gassaway, West Virginia. The company currently operates over 100 stores in most of the state of West Virginia, and border areas of Virginia, Kentucky, and Ohio. All Go-Mart stations are unbranded. Go-Mart is the 53rd-largest convenience store chain in the United States.

History

1914–1970s: Precursor
Go-Mart traces its history to 1914 when brothers Fred, Charles and Rod Heater, operating as the Heater Oil Co., began selling axle grease, kerosene and other petroleum products to farms and businesses in central West Virginia, using flat-bottomed boats on the Little Kanawha River.

By the early 1920s the Heater brothers were operating bulk plants along railroad lines, and following the Great Depression and the death of Charles Heater, Fred Heater decided to centralize the business in Gassaway, where it is headquartered today.  In the early 1960s, Fred Heater's health was failing and he sold the business to his sons, John, William and James.

1970s: Founding
When self-service gasoline pumps were legalized in West Virginia in 1970, the Heaters built the state's first self-service gas station, in Shinnston, and called it "Go-Tron."  Six months later they rebuilt their Gassaway store into their first convenience food and gas store and Manager Karen Sattler named it "Go-Mart" after an employee contest. By 1977, Go-Mart had 16 stores.

1980s–present: Expansion
Originally it used Chevron branding, as Chevron did not do business in the area, although it sourced its gasoline privately. When Chevron moved into the area as a part of the collapse of Gulf Oil (Chevron ultimately withdrew from West Virginia in 2010), it switched to unbranded products, and later converted some stations to Shell. The company now employs approximately 1,200 people and is the state's 41st largest private employer.

References

External links
 
 Go-Mart company profile at Yahoo! Biz

Braxton County, West Virginia
Companies based in West Virginia
Economy of the Eastern United States
Convenience stores of the United States
Gas stations in the United States